The Vicente Fox Center of Studies, Library and Museum is a presidential history center founded by former President of Mexico (2000-2006) Vicente Fox in San Cristóbal near his ranch in Guanajuato, Mexico. The Center is funded by the Fox Center Civil Association.

Some of the members of the civil association are:
 Vicente Fox
 Marta Sahagún
 Carlos Slim Helú
 Emilio Azcárraga Jean
 Ricardo Salinas Pliego
 Olegario Vázquez Raña
 Roberto Hernández
 Federico Sada González
 Lorenzo Zambrano
 Arturo Elías Ayub

See also
 List of libraries in Mexico

References

External links
 Center of Studies, Library and Museum Vicente Fox

Museums established in 2007
Center of Studies
Libraries in Mexico
Museums in Guanajuato
History museums in Mexico
Fox, Vincent
Fox, Vincent